Marohl is a surname. Notable people with the surname include:

 Dan Marohl (born 1978), American lacrosse player
 Steve Marohl, American lacrosse player

Surnames of German origin